CIA II: Target Alexa is a 1993 action film, directed by and starring Lorenzo Lamas and his then wife Kathleen Kinmont. It is a sequel to CIA Code Name: Alexa (1992).

Plot 
When Alexa (Kathleen Kinmont) was captured, Mark Graver (Lorenzo Lamas), the best CIA agent, tried to turn her against her latest employer who had diplomatic immunity. Graver used Alexa to find a stolen microchip. Alexa is unable to turn on her own, so Graver must find the key to unlock her conviction.

Cast 
 Lorenzo Lamas as CIA Agent Mark Graver
 Kathleen Kinmont as Alexa
 John Savage as Franz Kluge
 John Saint Ryan as Ralph Straker (Credited as John Ryan)
 Lori Fetrick as Lana
 Pamela Dixon as CIA Chief Robin
 Al Sapienza as Raines (Credited as Alex Statler)
 Sandee Van Dyke as Tanya
 Michael Chong as Colonel Trang
 Daryl Keith Roach as Wilson (Credited as Daryl Roach)
 Gary Wood as Rick
 Larry Manetti as Radcliffe
 Branscombe Richmond as General Mendoza
 Mitchell Sacharoff as Robertson
 Anthony De Longis as Gate Mercenary (Credited as Anthony DeLongis)
 Steven Novak as Macho Mercenary
 Jay Lasoff as Mercenary (uncredited)

See also 
 CIA Code Name: Alexa

References

External links
 

1993 films
American action films
1990s English-language films
1993 action films
1990s American films